Coming Home is an American reality television series on the Lifetime network that premiered on March 6, 2011. The series is paired with Lifetime's drama series Army Wives.

Premise

The series focuses on the family reunions that occur as United States military personnel return home from active duty overseas, and the lengths that the returning member goes through to make the reunion a surprise.

Episodes

Season 1 (2011)

Season 2 (2012)

References

2010s American reality television series
2011 American television series debuts
English-language television shows
Lifetime (TV network) original programming
2012 American television series endings